Tillandsia setacea, the southern needleleaf, is a species of flowering plant in the genus Tillandsia. It has a scattered, disjunct distribution in the southeastern United States (Florida, Georgia), northwestern and southern Mexico (Jalisco, Sinaloa, Nayarit, Chiapas, Oaxaca, Campeche), Guatemala, the West Indies (Cayman Islands, Cuba, Hispaniola, Jamaica, Puerto Rico) and the State of Pará in northeastern Brazil.

Cultivars
 Tillandsia 'But'

References

setacea
Flora of Mexico
Flora of the Southeastern United States
Flora of the Caribbean
Flora of Guatemala
Flora of Brazil
Plants described in 1797
Taxa named by Olof Swartz